Rodrigo Paz Delgado (20 December 1933 – 17 August 2021) was an Ecuadorian politician and businessman. He was the mayor of Quito from 1988 to 1992. He ran as a presidential candidate in 1995–6. One of his political parties was Democracia Popular (DP).

Paz was Minister of Finance from 1980 to 1981. He had been the principal director of Liga Deportiva Universitaria de Quito since 1997, but had been involved with the club since 1959.

On August 17, 2021, Paz died of gastrointestinal bleeding in Tampa, Florida at the age of 87.

References

External links
El Comercio profile 

1933 births
2021 deaths
Mayors of Quito
Ecuadorian Ministers of Finance
Ecuadorian businesspeople
L.D.U. Quito
Christian Democratic Union (Ecuador) politicians
People from Tulcán
Deaths from gastrointestinal hemorrhage